The Hope Valley line is a trans-Pennine railway line in Northern England, linking Manchester with Sheffield. It was completed in 1894.

Passenger services on the line are operated by Northern Trains, East Midlands Railway and TransPennine Express, while the quarries around Hope, producing stone and cement, provide a source of freight traffic.

From the western portal of the tunnel, the line runs through Chinley, then splits. The northern branch runs via  towards .

History

Sheffield and Midland Joint Section
Initially, in 1867, it joined the Manchester, Sheffield and Lincolnshire Railway at Hyde Junction, running into Manchester London Road, but in 1875 a more direct route was built through . When  was opened by the Cheshire Lines Committee, a new line was built through .

Dore and Chinley
In 1872, the Midland Railway's only route from Sheffield to Manchester was via Ambergate. However, the "Dore and Chinley Railway" was floated independently in 1872 and, unsuccessfully, until the Midland took an interest, since it would provide a more direct route, connecting through Chinley into Manchester. The line was authorised in 1884 and work began in 1888.

The  line took five years to build, opening to goods traffic in November 1893, with passenger traffic being carried from June 1894. The terrain through Hope Valley and the Vale of Edale was easy enough by Midland standards, but at each end there were formidable obstacles, negotiated by means of the Totley and Cowburn Tunnels.

20th century
At the time of the Beeching review, the line was running in competition with the recently modernised and faster Woodhead Line and its closure was suggested. On appeal, British Rail was required to keep the Hope Valley line open to passenger traffic; it was decided that the Woodhead route would be closed to passenger traffic instead  and then subsequently to all traffic in 1981, due to the high cost of further upgrading the line to modern standards.

Metrolink proposals
In the early 1980s, proposals were put forward to convert the Piccadilly–Belle Vue–Rose Hill/Marple section of the Hope Valley line to light rail operation for the proposed Manchester Metrolink system. While construction of Metrolink went ahead, the Hope Valley line was not included in the system which was completed in 1992. When in 2000, proposals for a large-scale extension of Metrolink were announced by the government, these still did not include conversion of the Hope Valley line; but, subsequently, planning documents from Network Rail and from the Greater Manchester Passenger Transport Authority have suggested that this route might be appropriate for tram-train operation, and, as such, it was suggested to the Department for Transport as a possible location for a national tram-train pilot.

2019 closure
On 1 August 2019, the line was closed between Marple and Sheffield amid fears that the dam at Toddbrook Reservoir would collapse, following heavy rain, which would flood the town of Whaley Bridge. The Buxton line, between Hazel Grove and Buxton, was also closed because of this. The line was re-opened on 7 August 2019.

Services
The following passenger services traverse all or part of the Hope Valley Line:

Northern Trains: 

East Midlands Railway: 

TransPennine Express:

Future

In 2005 planning applications for various parts of the scheme were submitted. In 2015, a consultation pack on the capacity enhancement of the line was released by Network Rail.

Nottinghamshire County Council and the Department for Transport have investigated the possibility of adding another service that does not call at Sheffield in order to improve the journey time between Nottingham and Manchester. Stopping (and changing direction) in Sheffield, the fastest journey is 110 minutes (in 2019), but the council has estimated bypassing Sheffield would cut the time to 85 minutes. Suggested improvements on a  stretch near Stockport may reduce journey times by 2–3 minutes.

Network Rail, in partnership with South Yorkshire ITA, will redouble the track between Dore Station Junction and Dore West Junction, at an estimated cost of £15 million. This costing is based on four additional vehicles in traffic to deliver the option, however, this will depend on vehicle allocation through the DfT rolling stock plan. This work will be programmed, subject to funding, in conjunction with signalling renewals in the Dore/Totley Tunnel area.

In 2018, proposals were published for works in order to fit in an all-day (07:00–19:00) hourly Manchester–Sheffield via New Mills Central stopping service, by extending an existing Manchester–New Mills Central service. Planning permission for the upgrade was granted in February 2018, but delays mean that this will now not be completed until 2023. The TWAO was also published in 2018. These changes to allow three fast trains, a stopping train and freight trains each hour were also supported in a Transport for the North investment report in 2019, together with “further interventions” for the Northern Powerhouse Rail programme.

In March 2021, it was announced by Minister of State for Transport, Andrew Stephenson, that £137 million would be used to upgrade the line. The local MP Robert Largan claimed he had campaigned hard for this upgrade. A joint venture between Volker Rail and Story Contracting was awarded an £80 million contract for the delayed Hope Valley upgrade. The work includes creating a  passing loop between Bamford and Hathersage, and adding a second track and platform at Dore and Totley station. This will allow passenger trains to pass slow-moving freight and allow three fast trains per hour between Manchester and Sheffield. There will also be improvements to the Jaggers Lane Bridge in Hathersage. Work started on 29 May 2022 and is expected to be complete by spring 2024.

Freight

Around 66% of the works output ( per year) of cement from Hope Cement Works a year is taken away by rail from the seven-road Earle's Sidings at Hope. When G & T Earle opened Earle's Cement works in 1929, it was linked to the Hope Valley Line by a  single track railway, which was worked by steam until 1963. Most of the cement now travels over it in trains hauled by class 20 locomotives to Earle's Sidings, where it is taken over by Freightliner.

See also
 Great Rocks Line
 Transpennine Route Upgrade

References

Sources

Rail transport in Derbyshire
Rail transport in Sheffield
Transport in the Metropolitan Borough of Stockport
Peak District
Railway lines in North West England
Railway lines in Yorkshire and the Humber
Standard gauge railways in England